Reliance Broadcast Network Limited (RBNL) is a subsidiary of the Indian Reliance Anil Dhirubhai Ambani Group. Reliance Broadcast Network operates Big FM Radio stations and BIG Magic Television stations in India.

Music Broadcast entered an agreement for the acquisition of Reliance Broadcast Network in June 2019, acquiring 24% of the equity share capital of RBNL and the entire equity stake of promoters in RBNL.

The network produced the BIG Television Award in June 2011. A jury shortlisted people from Hindi reality and fiction programmes for awards, after which audience members cast ballots for performers they most liked.

References

External links
 

Reliance Entertainment subsidiaries
Mass media companies of India